Gemma O'Connor may refer to:

 Gemma O'Connor (writer) (born 1940), Irish mystery writer
 Gemma O'Connor (camogie)  (born 1985), Irish camogie player